is a Japanese television personality and model. Born in Tokyo, she is the daughter of a Japanese father and an American mother, herself a former model. Her father, Tatsuo Umemiya, was an actor, and former original Iron Chef judge.

Umemiya has a daughter, Momoka, by her former husband, identified only as "Mr C", whom she divorced on 28 January 2003 after an 18-month marriage.

Publications
 Anna: Ai no Nikki (アンナ 愛の日記 (Anna - Diary of Love)) photo book (1995, Shinchosha)
 "Minikui Ahiru no Ko" datta Watashi (「みにくいあひるの子」だった私 (I Used to be an Ugly Duckling)) (2001, Kodansha)

References

External links
 Official blog 
 

Japanese female models
Japanese television personalities
1972 births
Living people
Japanese people of American descent
Stardust Promotion artists